KTHS may refer to:

 KTHS (AM), a radio station licensed to Berryville, Arkansas, United States
 KTHS-FM, a radio station licensed to Berryville, Arkansas, United States
 KAAY, a radio station originally licensed to Hot Springs, Arkansas, United States
 KTHV, a television station licensed to Little Rock, Arkansas, United States
 Kerang Technical High School, Kerang, Victoria, Australia